Xyletobius sykesii is a species of beetle in the family Ptinidae.

Subspecies
These two subspecies belong to the species Xyletobius sykesii:
 Xyletobius sykesii molokaiensis Perkins, 1910
 Xyletobius sykesii sykesii Perkins, 1910

References

Further reading

 
 
 
 

Ptinidae
Beetles described in 1910